Jeffrey Thomas Yurek (born 1971) is a former politician in Ontario, Canada. He was a Progressive Conservative member of the Legislative Assembly of Ontario who represented the riding of Elgin—Middlesex—London. He was an MPP between 2011-2022.

Background
Yurek was born and raised in St. Thomas, Ontario. He worked as a pharmacist in a family business with his brother. He lives with his wife Jenn and their daughter.

Politics
Yurek ran in the 2011 provincial election as the Progressive Conservative candidate in the riding of Elgin—Middlesex—London. He defeated Liberal candidate Laurie Baldwin-Sands by 8,696 votes. He was re-elected in the 2014 provincial election defeating NDP candidate Kathy Cornish by 8,820 votes.

He was previously the party's health critic and later served in cabinet.

He put forward a private member's bill, that was passed unanimously, allowing students to carry lifesaving medicines on their person. The bill was named 'Ryan's Law', after a student died from having his medical inhaler locked in the principal's office 

On June 20, 2019, he was named Minister of the Environment, Conservation and Parks.

On January 7, 2022, Yuruk announced that he wouldn't be seeking a 4th term and he would resign his seat at the end of February. He was succeeded by Rob Flack in the 2022 Ontario general election.

Election results

Cabinet positions

References

External links

1971 births
Living people
Members of the Executive Council of Ontario
Progressive Conservative Party of Ontario MPPs
21st-century Canadian politicians